Donald L. Saltsman (December 15, 1933 – July 3, 2014) was an American politician from Peoria, Illinois.

Born in Peoria, Illinois, Saltsman went to Illinois Central College and the University of Illinois.  He was a firefighter for the City of Peoria from 1956 to 1984. For 12 years he served as the President of Associated Fire Fighters of Illinois Local 50, the union representing Peoria fire fighters.

Saltsman was elected to the 92nd District seat of the Illinois House of Representatives as a Democrat in 1980, taking office in 1981 and remaining until he was narrowly defeated in the 1996 Democratic primary election by Ricca Slone.

He died in Peoria, Illinois and buried at Peoria's Resurrection Mausoleum.

References

1933 births
2014 deaths
American firefighters
American trade union leaders
Illinois Central College alumni
Democratic Party members of the Illinois House of Representatives
Politicians from Peoria, Illinois
University of Illinois alumni